Huron County is a county of the province of Ontario, Canada. It is located on the southeast shore of its namesake, Lake Huron, in the southwest part of the province. The county seat is Goderich, also the county's largest community.

The population reported in the 2021 Census for this predominantly agricultural area with many villages and small towns was 61,366 in a land area of 3,399 square kilometres.  Of the total population, 7,628 reside in Goderich.

History

The portion of the Huron Tract ceded to the Canada Company was established as the "County of Huron" in 1835, with the exception of certain townships that were transferred to other counties:

 Adelaide Township went to Middlesex County
 The townships of Moore and Sarnia, Plympton, Enniskillen, Warwick, Brooke and Bosanquet went to Kent County

Historic townships
In 1835, the county was declared to consist of the following townships:

 Biddulph
 Blanshard
 Colborne
 Downie
 Ellice
 South Easthope
 North Easthope
 Fullarton
 Goderich
 Hay
 Hibbert
 Hullett
 Logan
 McKillop
 McGillivray
 Stephen
 Stanley
 Tuckersmith
 Usborne
 Williams

They have since devolved to the following counties (as outlined in red):

Territorial evolution
Legislation was passed by the Legislative Assembly of Upper Canada in 1838 to authorize the separation of the county from the London District and constitute it as the Huron District. The county was extended northward in 1840, upon the survey of a new range of townships on its northern boundary, beginning with Ashfield Township, and later including Wawanosh, Morris, Grey and Elma. The District itself came into being in October 1841.

Huron County was continued for electoral purposes in 1845, and the District was extended northwards as far as the Bruce Peninsula in 1846.

The District (which existed for judicial and municipal purposes) was abolished at the beginning of 1850. Legislation passed later in the same session of the Legislative Assembly of the Province of Canada provided for the county to be reconstituted as the United Counties of Huron, Perth and Bruce, with the territory of the Bruce Peninsula withdrawn and annexed to Waterloo County. The townships were distributed as follows:

The Bruce Peninsula was later returned to Bruce in 1851. The County of Perth was given its own Provisional Municipal Council at that time, and was separated from the United Counties in 1853.

Several townships were transferred to Middlesex County:

 Williams, in 1845
 Biddulph and McGillivray, in 1862.

Legislation was passed in 1866 to provide for the dissolution of the United Counties on January 1, 1867, with Huron and Bruce County becoming separate counties for all purposes.

Government
The Huron County Council consists of fifteen members from the nine area municipalities to ensure that each is represented on this council. Each year, a Warden is elected from the group; this individual chairs meetings and represents the County at various functions. Elected to Ashfeild-Colborne-Wawanosh Council in 2014, and acclaimed as Mayor in 2018, the current Warden is Glen McNeil.

Most of the population of the county resides in the Huron—Bruce, formerly Huron and Huron—Middlesex, federal electoral district. The majority also reside in the Huron—Bruce (provincial electoral district) formerly known as Huron and Huron—Middlesex.

The county's Official Plan (2015) addresses the following issues: "agriculture, community services, the economy, natural environment, extractive resources, and settlement patterns."  According to this document, agriculture is a particularly significant part of the economy since "Huron leads all counties and regions in Ontario in total value of production; and it also exceeds the production totals of several provinces".

Municipalities
Huron County comprises nine lower-tier municipalities (in order of population):

 Municipality of South Huron (population centre: Exeter)
 Municipality of Huron East (population centres: Seaforth, Brussels)
 Town of Goderich
 Municipality of Central Huron (population centre: Clinton)
 Municipality of Bluewater (population centre: Bayfield)
 Township of Ashfield–Colborne–Wawanosh
 Township of North Huron (population centre: Wingham, Blyth)
 Municipality of Howick
 Municipality of Morris-Turnberry

The boundaries of the county's municipalities have been in effect since 2001, after the provincial government imposed mergers throughout the province.

Demographics

Historic populations:
 Population in 2001: 59,701
 Population in 1996: 60,220

Communities

Amberley (border with Bruce County)
Auburn
Bayfield
Belgrave
Belmore (border with Bruce County)
Benmiller
Bluevale
Blyth
Brucefield
Brussels
Carlow
Centralia (border with Middlesex County)
Clinton
Corbett (border with Middlesex County)
Crediton
Dashwood
Drysdale
Dungannon
Egmondville
Ethel
Exeter
Fordwich
Goderich
Gorrie
Harpurhey
Hensall
Holmesville
Huron Park
Kinburn
Kingsbridge
Kintail
Kippen
Kirkton (border with Perth County)
Lakelet
Leadbury
Londesborough
Molesworth (border with Perth County)
Mount Carmel (border with Middlesex County)
Nile
Port Albert
St. Augustine
St. Columban (border with Perth County)
St. Joseph
Saltford
Seaforth
Shipka
Summerhill
Sunshine
Vanastra
Varna
Walton
Whitechurch (border with Bruce County)
Wingham
Winthrop
Whalen Corners (border with Perth and Middlesex Counties)
Woodham (border with Perth County)
Wroxeter
Zurich

Former communities/ghost towns

Donnybrook
Francistown
Mafeking
McGaw
Rodgerville
Sodom
Spidertown  (border with Middlesex County)

See also

 List of municipalities in Ontario
 List of Ontario Census Divisions
 List of townships in Ontario
 List of counties in Ontario
 Goderich, Ontario
 List of secondary schools in Ontario#Huron County

References

Further reading

External links

 
Counties in Ontario
Lake Huron
Southwestern Ontario